Russell Curry (born August 28, 1956 in Minneapolis, Minnesota) is an American actor. He played Tyus Robinson on Sunset Beach, Lt. Vic Boswell on Santa Barbara, and Carter Todd on Another World .

Filmography

External links
 

1956 births
American male television actors
American male soap opera actors
Male actors from Minneapolis
Living people